Erwin Romero Escudero (born July 27, 1957) is a former Bolivian football player, who participated in 49 games for the Bolivia national team between 1977 and 1989

Nicknamed Chichi, Romero was a gifted midfield playmaker noted for his vision and ball control. Some of the clubs he played for include Oriente Petrolero, Quilmes, Blooming and Bolívar. Romero played for Bolivia in four World Cup qualifying campaigns- 1978, 1982, 1986 and 1990 as well as the 1979 and 1983 Copa América tournaments.

He is one of the national league's all-time top 10 scorers with 134 goals in 348 appearances between 1977 and 1992.

International goals

References

External links
Futbolista Tribute 
OrienteBlog 
Eldeber.com.bo 

1957 births
Living people
Bolivian footballers
Bolivia international footballers
Bolivian expatriate footballers
1979 Copa América players
1983 Copa América players
Club Destroyers players
Oriente Petrolero players
Quilmes Atlético Club footballers
Club Bolívar players
Club Blooming players
C.D. Jorge Wilstermann players
Atlético Bucaramanga footballers
Bolivian Primera División players
Categoría Primera A players
Expatriate footballers in Argentina
Expatriate footballers in Colombia
Bolivian expatriate sportspeople in Argentina
Bolivian expatriate sportspeople in Colombia
Association football midfielders